VfL Wolfsburg finished 8th in Bundesliga, qualifying for the UEFA Intertoto Cup. The club got into the spotlight signing Bayern Munich star Stefan Effenberg, who finished his career with a season in the Volkswagen-owned club. Elsewhere, Martin Petrov and Tomislav Marić had successful seasons, being pivotal in the European qualification.

Players

First-team squad
Squad at end of season

Left club during season

Results

Bundesliga

References

VfL Wolfsburg seasons
Wolfsburg